is a Japanese video game developer. It was founded in October 1990 by Hiroshi Hamagaki and Tomo Kimura, who left Sega to form the company. The company is best known for its racing game titles.

History 
In its early years, Genki released games in different genres, looking for its niche. On one end of the spectrum, there was Devilish, a game similar to Arkanoid that was released for Sega's Game Gear and Mega Drive systems in 1991. On the other end, there was Kileak: The DNA Imperative, a first-person mecha shooting game for the PlayStation which was released in 1995 and received a sequel, Epidemic.

They developed two MotoGP video games for the SNES: GP-1 (1993) and GP-1 RS: Rapid Stream (1994).

Genki found its niche in 1994 with the release of Shutokō Battle '94 Keichii Tsuchiya Drift King for the SNES—the first in a long-running series of racing games. Shutokou Battle 2 followed one year later, in 1995, and was also for the SNES.

Within the same year, Genki shifted towards developing 3D games, continuing the Shutokou Battle series with Highway 2000 (released in Japan as Wangan Dead Heat) on the Sega Saturn. Genki also produced major titles for both the PlayStation and Nintendo 64 consoles in the following two years, including another Shutokou Battle game for the PlayStation (known in Western markets as Tokyo Highway Battle) and Multi-Racing Championship for the N64. They also developed Jade Cocoon for the PlayStation in 1998.

Shutokou Battle 

Continuing with the genre that is consistently the most rewarding for them, Genki continued the Shutokou Battle series, releasing a title for Sega's Dreamcast console in 1999. This game was released in Western markets, where it came to be known as Tokyo Xtreme Racer (U.S.) and Tokyo Highway Challenge (Europe). The Dreamcast version of Shutokou Battle enjoyed much greater success than any of its predecessors, and was followed by Shutokou Battle 2, also for the Dreamcast, and Shutokou Battle Zero for the PlayStation 2.

In 2002, Namco partnered with Genki to produce a game based on Michiharu Kusunoki's racing manga, Wangan Midnight. Namco developed the arcade version (based largely on Genki's gameplay mechanics), which was imported to the U.S., while Genki developed the Japan-only PlayStation 2 version. In 2003, Genki released Shutokou Battle 01 (Tokyo Xtreme Racer 3) for the PlayStation 2. Namco partnered with Sega to continue its arcade game series with the release of Wangan Midnight Maximum Tune in 2004 that shifted away from the Shutoko Battle style. It is still developed today and receives regular updates across Japan, Asia, Oceania, China, and North America remaining as an Arcade Exclusive with Genki still featuring in its credits. Genki continued to produce the Japan-only Wangan Midnight games for the PlayStation 3 (with online mode) and PlayStation Portable in June and of September 2007. These games stuck to the gameplay of the original PS2 game and were not ports of the arcade versions, something that Sega had success with in their Initial D series of games.

GRP: Genki Racing Project 
In response to the success of their racing titles, particularly the Shutokou Battle series, Genki established a division dedicated to that genre in 2003 called the Genki Racing Project, or GRP. The GRP's first title was Shutokou Battle Online for Microsoft Windows, which tried to apply an MMO-like aspect to the existing gameplay of the series. The game and its update version were sold only in Japan but were playable from anywhere as free online trial versions (with free registration) were available for download on the game's website.

Less than two months later, the GRP released the touge-based drifting/racing game Kaido Battle, which was a rather stark departure from the Tokyo-highway-based Shutokou Battle series. Kaido Battle was followed by Kaido Battle 2: Chain Reaction in 2004 and Kaido Battle: Touge No Densetsu in 2005. All three titles were released for the PS2. Kaido Battle and Kaido Battle: Touge no Densetsu were both released in North America, under the titles Tokyo Xtreme Racer: Drift and Tokyo Xtreme Racer: Drift 2, respectively. By comparison, European markets received Kaido Battle 2: Chain Reaction and Kaido Battle: Touge no Densetsu, under the names Kaido Racer and Kaido Racer 2.

In 2005, Genki released Shutokou Battle: Zone of Control for PlayStation Portable. It was translated and released in the US as Street Supremacy.

Among the various other adaptations of Shutokou Battle lies another unique title marketed as a "Car Tuning RPG", called Racing Battle: C1 Grand Prix, which was released for the PS2 in 2005. Racing Battle departed from highway and mountain racing, focusing on real-life tracks such as Tsukuba Circuit, Suzuka Circuit, and TI Circuit.

The last Shutokou Battle game at the time of this writing is Shutokou Battle X for the Xbox 360, which was released in 2006 and is known in western markets as Import Tuner Challenge.

In late 2006, Genki announced they would end the Shutokou Battle series, and eventually shut down the Genki Racing Project, as a part of the cost-cutting operation.

But now, on July 22, 2016, after 10 years, Genki announced that the Project would be rebooted, hoping to have new Shoutoku and/or Kaido Battle games for the Next Generation. On December 27, 2016, they release the countdown for the new racing project. The countdown ended up being for the 2017 Shoutoku Battle Mobile Game, Shoutoku Battle Xtreme, which servers went offline in November of that year.

Kengo 

Kengo (剣豪) is the name of a series of fighting video games developed by Genki. Kengo is considered a spiritual successor to the Bushido Blade game series for the PlayStation.

Genki released four games in the series, between 2000 and 2006, for the Playstation 2 and Xbox 360: Kengo: Master of Bushido, Kengo 2, Kengo 3 and Kengo Zero (Kengo: Legend of 9 in North America).

Spectrobes

In 2009 Genki finished developing Spectrobes: Origins. This game was the last in a trilogy started by Jupiter and published by Disney Interactive Studios, the game had potential and many people who played it agreed, but people who had played the first 2 games had no hope left for it, even though it was the last one, it kinda feels like a fitting ending sort of, leaving few questions to the player (questions you'd have if you've ve played the first 2 games) but it was also the last because it didn't do too good due to the first ones.

Recent works 
In 2010, Genki created an alternate reality game division called Genki ARG, to replace the discontinued Genki Racing Project. This division was closed in late of March 2012.

The Shutokou Battle series was revived with a Mobage version for mobile phones released on January 27, 2017. This is the first Shutokou Battle game after GRP was discontinued. On September 28 of the same year, however, Genki announced that they were discontinuing the service, to be shut down in end-November.

References

External links 
 
 MobyGame's entry on Genki

Software companies based in Tokyo
Video game companies established in 1990
Video game companies of Japan
Video game development companies
Video game publishers
Japanese companies established in 1990
Genki (company) games